Richard Gay (by 1559–1641), of Walcott Street and Westgate Street, Bath and Claverton, Somerset, was an English politician.

He was a mayor of Bath from 1614 to 1615, and a Member (MP) of the Parliament of England for Bath in 1626.

References

16th-century births
1641 deaths
English MPs 1626
People from Bath, Somerset
Mayors of Bath, Somerset